Crystal Lynn Lewis (born September 11, 1969) is an American contemporary Christian and jazz singer, songwriter and actress.

Lewis has been nominated for several Grammy Awards, and has won multiple GMA Dove Awards. Additionally, she has released numerous CCM chart-topping hits.

Lewis reached a commercial peak with her Billboard Top 5 albums: “Let Love In” (1990), "Beauty for Ashes" (1996), "Gold" (1998) and the Grammy-nominated Fearless (2000), which inspired young future superstars like Katy Perry and Tori Kelly.

Early life and career 
Crystal Lewis was born in Corona, California (where she grew up singing in her father's church). In 1984, at the age of 15, Lewis auditioned for a children's musical film called Hi Tops. It was written and produced by Ernie and Debby Rettino, creators of Psalty, the Singing Song Book. She passed the audition, and was able to go into the studio to participate on the soundtrack recording, with the rest of the cast members.

While working on the musical, Lewis met a member of the rockabilly band The Lifters. After becoming friends with the band members, Lewis was asked to join. Soon after, the band changed its name to Wild Blue Yonder. Wild Blue Yonder was together for two years, and recorded a single full-length album, Wild Blue Yonder. It was produced by Daniel Amos front man Terry Scott Taylor, for Frontline Records in 1986. Lewis also sang on D.A.'s album Fearful Symmetry in 1986, and Taylor's solo album A Briefing for the Ascent in 1987.

After Wild Blue Yonder disbanded, Frontline offered Lewis a solo recording contract at the age of 17. Her first solo project, Beyond the Charade, was released in 1987. It featured the song "Breakdown", written by musician Jon Gibson. In 1988, Lewis sang a duet with Gibson called "Lost Inside of You", from his successful Change of Heart album (also released via Frontline Records).

In 1992, Lewis worked in the sketch comedy television series Roundhouse, which aired on Nickelodeon. In 1996, Lewis released her Myrrh Records debut, Beauty for Ashes. The album included three CCM chart-topping singles, including "People Get Ready (Jesus Is Comin')", which was honored with Song of the Year. Her next album, Gold, followed in 1998. Lewis was also featured on Kirk Franklin's hit song, "Lean on Me" in 1998. In 2000, Lewis returned with Fearless and the Christmas album, Holiday! A Collection of Christmas Classics. In 2015, her self-titled album Crystal Lewis was released, and the soulful jazz album Rhapsody followed in 2019.

In May 2022, Lewis released Together We Can, an album with guest artists and duets. The pop, soul and jazz record features Ty Herndon, Nikki Leonti, Kate Flannery, Tori Kelly, Ally Brooke , Lia Booth and others. She also sings with her adult children, Solomon and Isabella. "I Can't Help It" was the debut single released from the album.

Personal life 
Lewis previously lived in Montana with then-husband Brian Ray, with whom she has two children, who were homeschooled. Lewis and Ray divorced after 28 years of marriage, and she now lives in California.

Her daughter, Isabella (Izzi Ray), is also a singer and songwriter. Her son, Solomon, also pursued a career in music. He produced his mother's 2011 release, Plain and Simple.

Discography 

 Beyond the Charade (1987)
 Joy (1988)
 Let Love In (1990)
 Remember (1991)
 Recuerda (Spanish version of Remember) (1991)
 The Bride (1993)
 La Esposa (Spanish version of The Bride) (1994)
 Hymns: My Life (1995)
 Himnos De Mi Vida (Spanish version of Hymns: My Life) (1995)
 Beauty for Ashes (1996)
 La Belleza De La Cruz (Spanish version of Beauty for Ashes) (1996)
 Gold (1998)
 Oro (Spanish version of Gold) (1998)
 Live At The Woodlands (1999)
 Fearless (2000)
 Holiday! A Collection of Christmas Classics (2000)
 Holy, Holy, Holy (2002)
 Santo, Santo, Santo (Spanish version of Holy, Holy, Holy) (2002)
 See (2005)
 Joyful Noise (Songs for Kids!) (2006)
 Home for the Holidays (2010)
 Plain and Simple (2011)
 Crystal Lewis (2015)
 Suéltalo (Spanish version of her eponymous album Crystal Lewis) (2017)
 Rhapsody (2019)
 Together We Can (2022)

Filmography

Awards and nominations

GMA Dove Awards

Additional awards

References

External links 
 
 

1969 births
American women singers
American gospel singers
Christian music songwriters
Performers of contemporary Christian music
Living people
Musicians from Anaheim, California
People from Corona, California
Myrrh Records artists
Singers from California
21st-century American women